Riyah is a small town and rural commune in Berrechid Province of the Casablanca-Settat region of Morocco. In the 2014 Moroccan census the commune recorded a population of 9373 people living in 1491 households. At the time of the 2004 census, the commune had a total population of 7562 people living in 1197 households.

References

Populated places in Berrechid Province
Rural communes of Casablanca-Settat